Martin is a home rule-class city in Floyd County, Kentucky, in the United States. The population was 634 as of the 2010 census.

History

Martin developed as a coal mining community in the early 1900s.  Its first post office, established in 1910, was named "Bucks Branch" after a tributary of Beaver Creek, the stream that runs through the city. In 1913, the community was renamed "Smalley" after a local landowner, Smalley Crisp.  By 1915, however, the community had been renamed "Martin" after the postmaster, Martin Van Allen.  The post office began officially using this name in 1926.

Geography
Martin is located near the center of Floyd County at  (37.567791, -82.759465). Kentucky Routes 80 and 122 run along the western side of the city. KY 122 leads northwest by a narrower road  to Prestonsburg and south  to Printer. Kentucky Route 1428 (signed as Main Street within the city) connects Martin with Allen to the northeast.

Beaver Creek, a tributary of the Levisa Fork, flows northward through the center of Martin.

Demographics

As of the census of 2000, there were 633 people, 295 households, and 166 families residing in the city. The racial makeup of the city was 97.31% White, 0.32% Native American, 1.11% Asian, 1.11% Pacific Islander, and 0.16% from two or more races. Hispanic or Latino of any race were 0.95% of the population.

There were 295 households, out of which 28.8% had children under the age of 18 living with them, 31.2% were married couples living together, 21.7% had a female householder with no husband present, and 43.4% were non-families. 40.3% of all households were made up of individuals, and 17.6% had someone living alone who was 65 years of age or older. The average household size was 2.08 and the average family size was 2.81.

In the city, the population was spread out, with 24.6% under the age of 18, 8.2% from 18 to 24, 24.6% from 25 to 44, 25.8% from 45 to 64, and 16.7% who were 65 years of age or older. The median age was 38 years. For every 100 females, there were 77.8 males. For every 100 females age 18 and over, there were 72.2 males.

The median income for a household in the city was $12,917, and the median income for a family was $18,571. Males had a median income of $35,469 versus $19,167 for females. The per capita income for the city was $10,773. About 46.1% of families and 44.0% of the population were below the poverty line, including 64.8% of those under age 18 and 19.5% of those age 65 or over.

Government
Martin uses a mayor–council form of government. The current mayor is Sam Howell. The representative body of the city of Martin is the city council. The council members include: Gary Akers, Bobby Dingus, April Gayheart, Charles Justice, Eulene Ratliff, and James (Jim) Reynolds.

Education
Martin's public schools are operated by Floyd County Schools. The following schools are in Martin:
 May Valley Elementary School
 Renaissance Learning Center

References

Further reading
 Slatalla, Michelle, The Town on Beaver Creek: The Story of a Lost Kentucky Community, Random House, New York, 2006

External links

Cities in Kentucky
Cities in Floyd County, Kentucky
Populated places established in 1920